Johnathon Simpson Snedden Russell (born 8 April 1990) is a Scottish professional footballer who plays as a winger for Major League Soccer club Sporting Kansas City. He has previously played for Dundee United, Forfar Athletic, Raith Rovers and Derby County. Russell represented Scotland at under-19 and under-21 level. He was first named in the Scotland squad in 2012, and made his full international debut in November 2014. Russell is the highest-scoring Scottish-born player in MLS history.

Club career

Dundee United

Russell, who had featured just five times for Dundee United's under-19 side in 2006–07, made his professional debut in the Scottish Premier League on 12 May 2007 in the 2–0 defeat at Falkirk, coming on as an 80th-minute substitute for Steven Robb.

In August 2008, Russell moved on loan to Forfar Athletic of the Scottish Football League Third Division until the end of the year, scoring twice on his début. In January 2009, Russell made his first start for Dundee United in the Scottish Cup fourth round victory at East Stirlingshire, scoring a second-half penalty kick for his first United goal. Russell returned to Forfar on loan for the remainder of the season, agreeing a contract extension with United in April until May 2012.

In September 2009, Russell played and scored in Dundee United's League Cup win against Ross County before undertaking a month's loan with Raith Rovers in the Scottish Football League First Division, which was subsequently extended until Boxing Day. The deal was further extended until the end of the season, and Russell ended his time in Kirkcaldy with his first senior hat-trick in a final day 4–1 win over Ross County.

In April 2011, Russell scored a header for Dundee United's second goal in a 3–2 win at Ibrox, in which David Goodwillie scored the winner in the 89th minute. On 21 July he scored for United in the 2011–12 UEFA Europa League, the second in a 3–2 second qualifying round second leg win against Polish side Śląsk Wrocław. United had lost the first leg 1–0, so were eliminated on the away goals rule. He also scored against Celtic that season, and established himself in the United team.

On 7 January 2012, Russell netted a hat-trick, the second of his career, in a 6–2 Scottish Cup win over Airdrie United. As of that match, Russell had scored a total of 9 goals in the 2011–12 season and it saw him become a regular in the starting line-up alongside Jon Daly.

On 19 January 2013, Russell scored his first SPL hattrick in a 3–2 win over Kilmarnock. Russell equalled Finn Døssing's record for the fastest ever Dundee United goal when he scored after 14 seconds in a 3–0 Scottish Cup victory against Rangers at Tannadice Park on 2 February.

In May 2013, it was reported that bids for Russell were made by Italian Serie A team Catania and English Championship side Derby County with Dundee United keen to sell Russell with a year left on his contract after his agent stated that Russell would not be signing a new contract. In June 2013; Derby County had an offer accepted for the striker.

Derby County
Russell joined Derby County on 10 June 2013 for a fee of around £750,000, and he signed a four-year contract. He scored twice on his debut in a pre-season friendly at Irish side Bohemians. Russell's competition for a starting place consisted of Chris Martin, Conor Sammon and Jamie Ward. Russell scored on his competitive debut from the penalty spot in Derby's 1–1 draw with Blackburn Rovers on 4 August. He scored a fifth in four friendlies in the Bass Charity Vase final against Burton Albion on 13 August, which Derby lost 3–2. Russell fractured his left fibula during the game and was ruled out of action for six weeks.

Sporting Kansas City
On 31 January 2018, Russell signed with Major League Soccer club Sporting Kansas City on a three-year contract. He made his debut for Sporting in the opening game of their 2018 MLS season, a 2–0 defeat against New York City FC on 4 March. Russell's solo goal against Los Angeles Galaxy earned him MLS Goal of the Week. Russell scored a hat-trick for Sporting KC in a 6–0 win against Vancouver Whitecaps on 20 April, earning him the MLS Player of the week award.

In March 2021, Russell was named captain after Matt Besler departed the club. On October 28, 2021, Russell was awarded MLS Player of the Week for Week 33 of the 2021 season in recognition of his brace in a 2-0 win over the Los Angeles Galaxy. Russell finished the 2021 regular season with 15 goals, placing him as the highest-scoring Scottish-born player in MLS history.

International career
In August 2007, Russell made his debut for the Scotland under-19s. He scored two goals in 10 appearances for the under-19s. Russell then played 11 times for the Scotland under-21s, scoring once in the process. He received his first call up to the full national team for the match against the United States in May 2012, but did not play. Russell made his full international debut in November 2014, in a 3–1 friendly home defeat to England. On as a second-half substitute, Russell provided the assist for Andrew Robertson to make it 2–1.

Uncapped since October 2015, he was recalled to the Scotland squad in May 2018, for friendlies against Peru and Mexico. On 24 March 2019 he scored his first international goal to secure a 2–0 away win over San Marino in UEFA Euro 2020 qualifying. Russell was unable to play for Scotland during 2020 as COVID-19 protocols made it impractical for him to travel between North America and Europe for international matches.

Career statistics

Club

International

Scores and results list Scotland's goal tally first, score column indicates score after each Russell goal

References

External links

 
  (2nd Forfar loan spell)
 
 

1990 births
Living people
Footballers from Glasgow
Scottish footballers
Association football midfielders
Dundee United F.C. players
Raith Rovers F.C. players
Forfar Athletic F.C. players
Derby County F.C. players
Sporting Kansas City players
Scottish Premier League players
Scottish Football League players
English Football League players
Major League Soccer players
Scotland youth international footballers
Scotland under-21 international footballers
Scotland international footballers
Scottish expatriate footballers
Expatriate soccer players in the United States
Scottish expatriate sportspeople in the United States
Designated Players (MLS)